Korlar is a village in the Jalilabad Rayon of Azerbaijan, close to bordering on Iran's northwestern border.

References 

Populated places in Jalilabad District (Azerbaijan)